The 2015–16 season was Herbalife Gran Canaria's 54th in existence and the club's 21st consecutive season in the top flight of Spanish basketball. Gran Canaria was involved in four competitions.

Players

Squad information

Players in

|}

Total spending:  €0

Players out

|}

Total income:  €0

Total expenditure: €0

Club

Technical staff

Kit
Supplier: Spalding / Sponsor: Herbalife

Pre-season and friendlies

Competitions

Overall

Overview

Supercopa de España

Liga ACB

League table

Results summary

Results by round

Matches

Results overview

ACB Playoffs

Quarterfinals

Eurocup

Regular season

Last 32

Knockout stage

Eighthfinals

Quarterfinals

Semifinals

Copa del Rey

Statistics

Liga ACB

ACB Playoffs

Copa del Rey

Supercopa de España

Eurocup

References

External links
 Official website
 CB Gran Canaria at ACB.com 
 CB Gran Canaria at the Eurocup

Gran Canaria
 
Gran